Alexander McMicken (27 August 1837 – 30 July 1916) was the sixth Mayor of Winnipeg in 1883.

After moving to Winnipeg in 1871, he established a banking career and the following year established a bank in his own name. After serving in two city council terms, he became as Mayor following the 1882 election.

He once lived at the J.C. Falls House at Roslyn Road, designated today as a historic building. McMicken Street in Winnipeg is named in his honour.

References

External links
 Biography at the Dictionary of Canadian Biography Online

1837 births
1916 deaths
Manitoba Liberal Party MLAs
Mayors of Winnipeg
People from the County of Brant